Daphnella allemani is a species of sea snail, a marine gastropod mollusk in the family Raphitomidae.

Description
The length of the shell attains 12.8 mm, its diameter 4.5 mm.

Distribution
This marine occurs off Taboga Island, Pacific Panama, and off the Galapagos Islands

References

External links
 Gastropods.com: Daphnella allemani
 Bartsch, Paul. "Descriptions of new marine mollusks from Panama, with a figure of the genotype of Engina." Proceedings of the United States National Museum (1931)

allemani
Gastropods described in 1931